Tityrus may refer to:

 The tityrus, an ovine beast in Medieval heraldry and Greek legend
 Tityrus, the father of the Amazon Helene in Greek mythology
 Tityrus, the shepherd in Virgil's Eclogues, or Virgil himself
 Tityrus, a pseudonym used by Edmund Spenser for Geoffrey Chaucer in The Shepheardes Calender
 Tityrus the pseudonym of J.A.H. Catton, editor of the Athletic News
 An alternative name for the Musimon, used in European heraldry to symbolize one in authority who leads with strength